Tara Gabriella Norris (born 4 June 1998) is an American cricketer who currently plays for Sussex, North West Thunder, Southern Brave and Delhi Capitals. She plays as a left-arm medium bowler. She has previously played for Loughborough Lightning and Southern Vipers.

Norris was born in the United States and played for the United States women's national cricket team at the 2021 ICC Women's T20 World Cup Americas Qualifier.

Early life
Norris was born on 4 June 1998 in Philadelphia, Pennsylvania, USA, and is half-Italian. She spent her early years in Spain, before moving to England at the age of eight. She attended Portslade Aldridge Community Academy and began playing for Horsham Cricket Club at a young age.

Domestic career
Norris made her county debut in 2014, for Sussex against Warwickshire. She did not bat or bowl. A year later, she was part of the Sussex squad that won the 2015 Women's Twenty20 Cup. In the 2018 Women's County Championship, Norris had a strong season, taking 10 wickets at an average of 10.30 as her side was promoted from Division 2. In 2019, Norris again had a successful county season, being Sussex's second-leading wicket-taker in both competitions, and hitting her maiden county half-century, scoring 59* opening the batting in a T20 victory over Warwickshire. She was Sussex's joint-leading wicket-taker in the 2021 Women's Twenty20 Cup, with 7 wickets at an average of 11.71. In the 2022 Women's Twenty20 Cup, Norris took eight wickets at an average of 7.87, including Twenty20 best bowling figures of 4/11, taken against Surrey.

In 2017, Norris also played for Southern Vipers in the Women's Cricket Super League. She played one match, bowling three overs and dismissing Jenny Gunn for her maiden KSL wicket. Ahead of the 2018 season, she moved to Loughborough Lightning, but did not play for them until 2019. Across her three appearances, she bowled three overs for no wicket.

In 2020, Norris returned to Southern Vipers for the Rachael Heyhoe Flint Trophy. She appeared in all 7 matches, including her side's 38-run victory in the Final over Northern Diamonds. She took 12 wickets at an average of 17.91, including taking 4/45 in a match against Western Storm. She was the joint-third leading wicket-taker across the whole tournament. In 2021, she was the joint-second leading wicket-taker in the Charlotte Edwards Cup, with 13 wickets at an average of 13.30. She achieved her Twenty20 best bowling in the tournament against Lightning, taking 4/14 from her 3.5 overs. In the Rachael Heyhoe Flint Trophy, Norris took 11 wickets at an average of 30.09, including taking her List A best bowling figures, again 4/14, against North West Thunder. In the final of the Rachael Heyhoe Flint Trophy, Norris hit her List A best of 40* as part of an unbroken stand of 78 for the eighth wicket with Emily Windsor to help her side recover from 109/7 to win the match, and the tournament, by 3 wickets with two balls to spare. She also played six matches for Southern Brave in The Hundred, taking 3 wickets at an average of 22.66. In 2022, Norris took two wickets in four appearances in the Charlotte Edwards Cup, and was Southern Vipers' leading wicket-taker in the Rachael Heyhoe Flint Trophy, with 12 wickets at an average of 19.75. She was again in the Southern Brave squad in The Hundred, but did not play a match. At the end of the 2022 season, it was announced that Norris had joined North West Thunder.

International career
In September 2021, Norris was named in the United States squad for the 2021 ICC Women's T20 World Cup Americas Qualifier. She made her Twenty20 International debut in the first match of the tournament, against Brazil on 18 October 2021. She went on to play five of USA's six matches in the tournament as they qualified for the 2022 ICC Women's World Twenty20 Qualifier, taking 4 wickets at an average of 7.75. In October 2021, she was named in the American team for the 2021 Women's Cricket World Cup Qualifier tournament in Zimbabwe.

Norris has also appeared for various England Development and Academy teams, including touring South Africa in 2018.

References

External links

1998 births
Living people
Cricketers from Philadelphia
American women cricketers
United States women Twenty20 International cricketers
American expatriate sportspeople in England
Sussex women cricketers
Southern Vipers cricketers
Loughborough Lightning cricketers
Southern Brave cricketers
Delhi Capitals (WPL) cricketers
21st-century American women